Georg Baselitz (born 23 January 1938) is a German painter, sculptor and graphic artist. In the 1960s he became well known for his figurative, expressive paintings. In 1969 he began painting his subjects upside down in an effort to overcome the representational, content-driven character of his earlier work and stress the artifice of painting. Drawing from myriad influences, including art of Soviet era illustration art, the Mannerist period and African sculptures, he developed his own, distinct artistic language.

He grew up amongst the suffering and demolition of World War II, and the concept of destruction plays a significant role in his life and work. These biographical circumstances are recurring aspects of his entire oeuvre. In this context, the artist stated in an interview: "I was born into a destroyed order, a destroyed landscape, a destroyed people, a destroyed society. And I didn't want to reestablish an order: I had seen enough of so-called order. I was forced to question everything, to be 'naive', to start again." By disrupting any given orders and breaking the common conventions of perception, Baselitz has formed his personal circumstances into his guiding artistic principles. To this day, he still inverts all his paintings, which has become the unique and most defining feature of his work.

Life 
Baselitz was born on 23 January 1938, in Deutschbaselitz (now a part of Kamenz, Saxony), in what was later East Germany. His father was an elementary school teacher, and the family lived in the local school building.

Baselitz attended the local school in Kamenz. In its assembly hall hung a reproduction of the painting Wermsdorfer Wald (1859) by Louis-Ferdinand von Rayski, an artist whose grasp of Realism was a formative influence on Baselitz. Baselitz also became interested in the writings of Jakob Böhme. By the age of 15, he had already painted portraits, religious subjects, still lifes, and landscapes, some in a futuristic style.

In 1955, he applied to study at the Kunstakademie in Dresden but was rejected. In 1956, he successfully enrolled at the Hochschule für Bildende und Angewandte Kunst in East Berlin. There he studied under professors Walter Womacka and Herbert Behrens-Hangler and befriended Peter Graf and Ralf Winkler (later known as A. R. Penck). After two semesters, however, he was expelled for "sociopolitical immaturity" because he did not comply with the socialist ideas of the DDR.

In 1957, he resumed his studies at the Hochschule der Künste in West Berlin, where he settled down and met his future wife, Johanna Elke Kretzschmar. In 1961, he attended Hann Trier's master class and completed his studies the following year. Trier's classes were described as a creative environment largely dominated by the gestural abstraction of Tachism and Art Informel. At the Hochschule der Künste, Baselitz immersed himself in the theories of Ernst Wilhelm Nay, Wassily Kandinsky, and Kasimir Malevich. During this time he became friends with Eugen Schönebeck and Benjamin Katz. Art historian Andreas Franzke describes Baselitz's primary artistic influences at this time as Jackson Pollock and Philip Guston.

In 1961, he adopted the name Georg Baselitz as a tribute to his home town.

Since 2013, he and his wife have lived in Salzburg in Austria and both obtained also Austrian citizenship in 2015. He married Kretzschmar in 1962 and is the father of two sons, Daniel Blau and Anton Kern, both gallerists.

Work

1957–1969

At the turn of 1959 to 1960, Baselitz began to produce his first original works in a distinct style of his own, among them the Rayski-Head (Rayski-Kopf) series and the painting G. Head (G. Kopf).

In 1963, Baselitz's first solo exhibition in West Berlin, at Galerie Werner & Katz, caused a public scandal. Two of the pictures, The Big Night Down The Drain (Die große Nacht im Eimer) (1962/63) and The Naked Man (Der Nackte Mann) (1962), were seized two days after the opening of the show by the public prosecutor on the ground of their lewd and obscene content, after likely a friend of the Galerist Michael Werner had already reported their being seized via German News Agency in the local newspaper B.Z. – a self-fulfilling prophecy and intentional scandal. The ensuing court case did not end until October 1965.

Baselitz spent the spring of 1964 at Schloß Wolfsburg and produced his first etchings in the printing shop there, which were exhibited later that year. Printmaking, a medium which he describes as having "symbolic power which has nothing to do with a painting", has since become an intrinsic part of his artistic repertoire. The next year, he won a six-month scholarship to study at the Villa Romana in Florence. While there, he studied Mannerist graphics and produced the Animal Piece (Tierstück) pictures. In general, Baselitz' greatest inspiration stems from writers and artists such as Antonin Artaud, Samuel Beckett, Edvard Munch, Jean Dubuffet, Willem de Kooning, Joseph Beuys, as well as from the expressionist artist association Die Brücke.

Series of Heroes and Fractures 
After returning from Florence to West Berlin, Baselitz created the series of Heroes (Helden, also known as Neue Typen), between 1965 and 1966, which, among others, includes the large-format composition The Great Friends (Die großen Freunde, Museum Ludwig, Cologne). These figures represent a metaphorical image of a man who, having neither nationality nor an affiliation to a place, throws the illusory and megalomaniacal ideals of the Third Reich and East Germany overboard with his desolate, broken, ragged appearance (for example, Rebel, held by the Tate Modern). Baselitz' Helden typically appear alone in a barren landscape with naked arms and legs, and hands opened in a summoning gestures. At times they bear attributes associated with the biography of the artist, who refers to his own childhood in the countryside and identifies himself with all of them. Through early 1969, he produced further large-format pictures, such as Woodsmen (Waldarbeiter) as part of a group of pictures known as Fracture Pictures (Frakturbilder).

Inverted paintings 
On the basis of his Fractures, Baselitz used a painting by Louis-Ferdinand von Rayski, Wermsdorf Woods (Wermsdorfer Wald), ca 1959, from his childhood at his elementary-school as a model, in order to paint his first picture with an inverted motif: The Wood On Its Head (Der Wald auf dem Kopf) (1969). By inverting his paintings, the artist is able to emphasize the organisation of colours and form and confront the viewer with the picture's surface rather than the personal content of the image. In this sense, the paintings are empty and not subject to interpretation. Instead, one can only look at them.

1970–1975
In the 1970s, Baselitz regularly exhibited at Munich's Galerie Heiner Friedrich. Most of the works he produced during this time were landscapes themed as pictures-within-a-picture. In 1970, at the Kunstmuseum Basel, Dieter Koepplin staged the first retrospective of drawings and graphic works by Baselitz. At the Galeriehaus in Cologne's Lindenstraße, Franz Dahlem put on the first exhibition of pictures with upside-down motifs. In 1971, the Baselitz family once again moved, relocating to Forst an der Weinstraße. He used the old village school as studio and started painting pictures featuring bird motifs. He exhibited several times in the next few years around Germany and also participated in the 1972 documenta 5 in Kassel, where again his work would generate harsh cristism. This same year he began using a fingerpainting technique. He painted landscapes until 1975, often based on motifs he would find in publications such as the ″Mitteilungen des Landesvereins Sächsischer Heimatschutz e. V.″. In 1975, the family moved to Derneburg, near Hildesheim. Baselitz visited New York for the first time and worked there for two weeks. He also visited Brazil, participating in the 13th Biennale in São Paulo.

1976–1980 
In 1976, Baselitz rented a studio in Florence, which he used until 1981. In 1977, he began working on large-format linocuts. He began teaching at the Staatliche Akademie der Bildenden Künste in Karlsruhe, where he was appointed professor in 1978. From 1978 until 1980, he worked on diptychs using the tempera painting technique (combinations of motifs), multipart pictures (series of motifs), and large-format individual works such as The Gleaner (Die Ährenleserin), Rubble Woman (Trümmerfrau), Eagle (Adler) and Boy Reading (Der lesende Knabe). The works became more abstract, with scriptural elements predominating. In 1980, he showed his first sculpture at the Venice Biennale.

1981–1989 
In 1981, Georg Baselitz set up an addition study in Castiglion Florentino, near Arezzo, which he used until 1987. His work was exhibited in New York for the first time in 1981. By 1982, he began devoting more time to sculpture, in addition to several exhibitions. In 1983, he began using Christian motifs in much of his artwork, and completed the major composition Dinner in Dresden (Nachtessen in Dresden). In the same year, he took up a new professorship at the Hochschule der Künste Berlin. In 1986, in recognition of Baselitz's achievements, he was awarded the Goslarer Kaiserring by the city of Goslar. Through the 1980s, Baselitz's work was exhibited frEquently in Germany. In 1989, the title Chevalier dans l'Ordre des Arts et des Lettres was conferred upon Baselitz by French Minister of Arts Jack Lang.

1990–2009
In 1990, at the Nationalgalerie im Alten Museum in Berlin, the first major exhibition of Baselitz's works in East Germany was staged. In 1992, he resigned from the Akademie der Künste in Berlin. In 1993, he designed the set for Harrison Birtwistle's opera Punch and Judy, staged under the direction of Pierre Audi at the Dutch Opera in Amsterdam. He also took part in the International Pavilion at the Venice Biennale with the Male Torso (Männlicher Torso) sculpture, accompanied by oversized drawings. In 1994, Baselitz designed a stamp for the French postal service. He also produced his first ground gold picture that year. In 1995, the first major retrospective of Baselitz's work in the US was staged at the Guggenheim in New York City. This retrospective was also exhibited in Washington, D.C. and Los Angeles. Throughout the 1990s, his work was exhibited frequently throughout Europe. In 2002, a retrospective of Baselitz's work was shown in Art Gallery of Yapı Kredi Bank in Istanbul.

During this time, Baselitz lived and worked near Hildesheim (Schloß Derneburg), from 2006 on near Munich, and in Imperia in Italy.

His work was exhibited in London, at the Royal Academy of Arts in late 2007, and in the White Cube gallery in 2009.

2010–2013
From 21 November 2009, to 14 March 2010, the Museum Frieder Burda and Baden-Baden's Staatliche Kunsthalle exhibited a comprehensive survey of the artist, featuring approximately 140 works. Baselitz. A Retrospective was presented at the two neighbouring museums, with the Museum Frieder Burda displaying 50 years of painting, the Staatliche Kunsthalle 30 years of sculpture.

In a 2013 interview, Baselitz was quoted as saying, "women don't paint very well. It's a fact. There are, of course, exceptions." Citing the comparative lack of commercial success of work by women painters in the most expensive markets as proof, he stated, "Women simply don't pass the test. (...) The market test, the value test".

Baselitz's statements elicited rebuttals from art critics like Sarah Thornton, author of Seven Days in the Art World, who countered, "[t]he market gets it wrong all the time. To see the market as a mark of quality is going down a delusional path. I'm shocked Baselitz does. His work doesn't go for so much." The record then for a painting by Baselitz was £3.2 million, while the record for a painting by Yayoi Kusama, a female artist, was £3.8 million.

Since 2014 
To this day, Baselitz is still an active, yet controversial artist and highly critical of German politics.  Over the past years, Baselitz has been working on a series of quiet portraits of both he and his wife, Elke, painted with dark washes of blue and black, somber tones that point to a mediation on mortality and aging.

Due to his 80th birthday on 23 January 2018, several retrospectives were held in his honor; for instance at Pinakothek der Moderne in Munich, Fondation Beyeler and Kunstmuseum in Basel, as well as in the U.S. at the Hirshhorn Museum in Washington D.C. With over 100 works highlighting six decades, the Hirshhorn's exhibition was the first major U.S. retrospective of Baselitz in more than twenty years.

Devotion, an exhibition of paintings and works on paper by Baselitz inspired by self-portraits of artists he admires or is influenced by, was exhibited at Gagosian gallery in New York in early 2019. The same year, Alan Cristea Gallery also published a series of 32 etchings by the artist of the same title.

In 2019 a retrospective curated by Kosme de Barañano was held at the Gallerie dell'Accademia in Venice, Italy, to coincide with the 58th Venice Biennale, the first exhibition by a living artist in the museum gallery. He also curated a special exhibition celebrating the life and work of his friend and fellow artist, Emilio Vedova, at the Fondazione Emilio e Annabianca Vedova, entitled Vedova di/by Baselitz.
In October 2021 a major retrospective opened at the Centre Pompidou including paintings, sculptures, drawings and prints, as well display cases with archival and documentary material. The exhibition was the last one curated by Bernard Blistène as director of the museum.

Style 
In the 1970s, Baselitz became famous for his upside-down images. He is seen as a revolutionary painter as he draws the viewer's attention to his works by making them think and sparking their interest. The subjects of the paintings don't seem to be as significant as the work's visual insight. Throughout his career, Baselitz has varied his style, ranging from layering substances to his style, since the 1990s, which focuses more on lucidity and smooth changes. His drawings and paintings of the past ten years show the artist revisiting, correcting, and varying his earlier work. Self-reflection goes hand in hand with an insouciant and surprisingly unfettered graphic style.

Controversy 
Baselitz's disparaging remarks about women artists have earned him a reputation as a sexist, and he has been accused of reinforcing gender bias in the art world.

Honours and awards
 1964: Villa Romana Prize
 1968: ars viva prize of the Cultural Committee of German Business
 1984–92: Member of the Academy of the Arts, Berlin
 1986: Goslarer Kaiserring
 1987: Chevalier de l'Ordre des Arts et des Lettres
 1992: Officier de l'Ordre des Arts et des Lettres
 1999: Honorary member at the Royal Academy of Arts, London
 1999: Art Prize Rhenus Mönchengladbach
 2001: Julio González Prize Valencia
 2002: Commandeur de l'Ordre des Arts et des Lettres
 2003: Lower Saxony State Prize
 2004: Praemium Imperiale
 2004: Honorary Professor at the Accademia delle Arti del Disegno in Florence
 2005: Austrian Decoration for Science and Art
 2006: Honorary Citizen of the city of Imperia
 2008: B.Z. Culture Prize
 2009: Full member of the Bavarian Academy of Fine Arts
 2009: Cologne-Fine-Art Award of the Association of German Galleries and Editions
 2012: Chevalier de la Légion d'Honneur
 2019: Foreign associate member Académie des Beaux-Arts

Works 
See List of works by Georg Baselitz

Bibliography 
 Georg Baselitz: Collected Writings and Interviews, edited by Detlev Gretenkort. Ridinghouse, London 2010.
 Georg Baselitz. Bilder, die den Kopf verdrehen. Seemann, Leipzig 2004. 
 Georg Baselitz. Paintings 1962–2001, edited by Detlev Gretenkort, mit einem Essay von Michael Auping, Milano 2002
 Georg Baselitz. Retrospektive 1964–1991, edited by Siegfried Gohr. Hirmer, Munich 1992. 
 Ich will es noch einmal schaffen Interview with Georg Baselitz, in art magazin 3/2006, S. 36–43
 Christian Malycha, Das Motiv ohne Inhalt. Malerei bei Georg Baselitz 1959–1969. Bielefeld 2008. Kerber Artbooks.

See also
 List of German painters

References

External links 
 Georg Baselitz Museum für Moderne Kunst Frankfurt
 Georg Baselitz Royal Academy, London
 Georg Baselitz  Galerie Thaddaeus Ropac
 Georg Baselitz White Cube
 Georg Baselitz Gagosian Gallery
 Georg Baselitz  Galerie Sabine Knust
 
 actual exhibitions with Georg Baselitz on Artfacts  Georg Baselitz works are still widely at present in various shows and permanent collections in museums or galleries throughout the world.
 Georg Baselitz Tate, London, works in the collection
 Georg Baselitz The British Museum, works in the collection
 Georg Baselitz National Galleries of Scotland, Edinburgh, works in the collection
 Georg Baselitz Fondation Beyeler, Riehen/Basel, works in the collections
 Georg Baselitz at the DASMAXIMUM KunstGegenwart, Germany

1938 births
Living people
People from Kamenz
20th-century German painters
20th-century German male artists
German male painters
21st-century German painters
21st-century German male artists
Modern painters
Members of the Academy of Arts, Berlin
Commandeurs of the Ordre des Arts et des Lettres
Recipients of the Praemium Imperiale
Recipients of the Austrian Decoration for Science and Art
German contemporary artists
20th-century German printmakers
Honorary Members of the Royal Academy
Neo-expressionist artists